Ekitiibwa kya Buganda (Luganda, Buganda's Pride) is the official anthem of the Kingdom of Buganda. It was composed in 1939 by Rev Polycarp Kakooza.

Lyrics
The lyrics are in Luganda. Traditionally, the full version is only sung in the presence of the Kabaka. Otherwise the short version, consisting of verses 1 and 4 plus the chorus, is sung.

Luganda lyrics
Chorus

Verse 1

Verse 2

Verse 3

Verse 4

Verse 5

English translation
Chorus
We are blessed, we are blessed
For our Buganda
Buganda's pride dates back in time
Lets also uphold it forever

Verse 1
Since time immemorial,
This country Buganda
Was known by all countries
The world over

"Verse 2"
The brave who came before us
Fought a lot of wars
And loved this country a lot
So we should also love it

"Verse 3"
Let the current generation fight
To uphold Buganda
As we remember our ancestors
Who died for this country

"Verse 4"
How will I sing and not praise
The King
He deserves to rule the whole of Buganda
So let's trust him

"Verse 5"
Lord God of kindness
Help us Lord
And pour your blessings
And keep our king
https://www.youtube.com/watch?v=li6zJp8tMns Anthem of Buganda link

References

External links
 Lyrics and MIDI

Buganda
Ugandan music